Tetragonoschema is a genus of beetles in the family Buprestidae, the jewel beetles. There are 17 species in the genus, which is distributed throughout the Americas from Mexico to Patagonia.

Species include:

 Tetragonoschema aeneum Kerremans, 1899
 Tetragonoschema albopilosum Hoscheck, 1931
 Tetragonoschema alvarengai Cobos, 1972
 Tetragonoschema argentiniense (Obenberger, 1915)
 Tetragonoschema brasiliae Obenberger, 1922
 Tetragonoschema brasiliense  (Kerremans, 1897)
 Tetragonoschema caerulans Théry, 1944
 Tetragonoschema crassum Théry, 1944
 Tetragonoschema cupreocingulatum Hoscheck, 1931
 Tetragonoschema darlingtoni Théry, 1944
 Tetragonoschema fallaciosum Théry, 1944
 Tetragonoschema fossicolle Kerremans, 1900
 Tetragonoschema grouvellei Théry, 1944
 Tetragonoschema humerale Waterhouse, 1882
 Tetragonoschema latum Théry, 1944
 Tetragonoschema medium Obenberger, 1922
 Tetragonoschema missionarium Obenberger, 1947
 Tetragonoschema nanum Obenberger, 1922
 Tetragonoschema opacicolle Théry, 1944
 Tetragonoschema patagonicum Obenberger, 1922
 Tetragonoschema pujoli Théry, 1944
 Tetragonoschema purpurascens Kerremans, 1897
 Tetragonoschema pygmaeum Théry, 1944
 Tetragonoschema quadratum (Buquet, 1841)
 Tetragonoschema rubromarginatum Théry, 1944
 Tetragonoschema santafeanum Obenberger, 1947
 Tetragonoschema strandi Obenberger, 1924
 Tetragonoschema sulci Obenberger, 1932
 Tetragonoschema tigrense Obenberger, 1947
 Tetragonoschema torresi Cobos, 1959
 Tetragonoschema trinidadense Bellamy, 1991
 Tetragonoschema tucumanum Cobos, 1949
 Tetragonoschema undatum (Steinheil, 1874)
 Tetragonoschema vianai Obenberger, 1947
 Tetragonoschema vicinum Théry, 1944

References

Buprestidae genera